The Halim Cabinet was the second and final cabinet of the Republic of Indonesia while it was one of 16 states in the United States of Indonesia. It served from 22 January until 15 August 1950, when the United States of Indonesia was dissolved and Indonesia once again became a unitary state.

Composition

Cabinet Leadership
Prime Minister: Abdul Halim
Deputy Prime Minister, also responsible for general affairs: Abdul Hakim (Masyumi Party)

Departmental Ministers
Minister of Home Affairs: Soesanto Tirtoprodjo (Indonesian National Party – PNI)
Minister of Justice: A.G. Pringgodigdo
Minister of Information: Wiwoho Purbohadidjojo (Masyumi Party)
Minister of Finance: Lukman Hakim (Indonesian National Party – PNI)
Minister of Agriculture: Sadjarwo Djarwonagoro (Indonesian Peasants Front - BTI)
Minister of Trade and Industry: Tandiono Manu (Socialist Party of Indonesia - PSI)
Minister of Public Works and Transport: Mananti Sitompul (Indonesian Christian Party, Parkindo)
Minister of Labor: Ma'as (Labour Party)
Minister of Social Affairs: Hamdani (Socialist Party of Indonesia - PSI)
Minister of Societal Development: Sugondo Djojopuspito (Socialist Party of Indonesia - PSI)
Minister of Education & Culture: S. Mangunsarkoro (Indonesian National Party – PNI)
Minister of Religious Affairs: Fakih Usman (Masyumi Party)
Minister of Health: Dr. Sutopo (PIR)

References
 

Cabinets of Indonesia
1950 establishments in Indonesia
1950 disestablishments in Indonesia
Cabinets established in 1950
Cabinets disestablished in 1950